The United Nations Service Medal for Korea (UNKM) is an international military decoration established by the United Nations on December 12, 1950 as the United Nations Service Medal. The decoration was the first international award ever created by the United Nations and recognized the multi-national defense forces which participated in the Korean War.

Criteria
The United Nations Service Medal (Korea) is awarded to any military service member, of an Armed Force allied with South Korea, who participated in the defense of South Korea from North Korea between the dates of June 27, 1950 and July 27, 1954.  The military forces of the Netherlands are awarded the medal for service to January 1, 1955, while the armed forces of Thailand and Sweden grant the award to July 27, 1955.

International Red Cross personnel engaged for service during the war with any United Nations relief team in Korea were not eligible for the medal.

The ultimate award authority of the United Nations Service Medal is United Nations Commander-in-Chief of military forces in Korea.  Most countries consider the United Nations Service Medal an automatic decoration, if some other Korean service award was bestowed, and generally award the medal without requesting permission through United Nations channels.  For instance, in the United States Armed Forces, any service member awarded the Korean Service Medal is automatically granted the United Nations Service Medal.

Medal name
On November 22, 1961, the United Nations officially changed the name of the United Nations Service Medal to the United Nations Service Medal Korea. This was as a prelude to the creation of many subsequent United Nations medals which are awarded for various operations around the world.

The United States and some other countries continue to refer to the medal as the United Nations Service Medal in an effort to maintain consistency with past military files referring to the medal by its original name.

Description
The UN Korea Medal is a 36mm wide circular medal of bronze alloy. The obverse depicts the ‘World-in-a Wreath' emblem of the United Nations. The reverse has the inscription: FOR SERVICE IN DEFENCE OF THE PRINCIPLES OF THE CHARTER OF THE UNITED NATIONS. Each participating country has the text in the most appropriate language, and the inscription may be in any one of the following languages: Amharic (Ethiopian Empire), Dutch, English, French, Greek, Italian, Korean, Spanish (Colombia), Tagalog (Philippines), Thai or Turkish. The medal hangs from a claw attachment on a straight bar suspension. Each medal is worn with a medal bar bearing the inscription KOREA in the same language as the reverse inscription.

See also
Awards and decorations of the Armed Forces of the Philippines
United Nations Medal
Korean War Service Medal, South Korea
Korea Medal, British and Commonwealth Forces.
Canadian Volunteer Service Medal for Korea, Canada.
Korean Service Medal, United States
Korea Defense Service Medal, United States

References

External links
NZDF Medals site
British regulations for award of medal - from NZDF site

Medals of the United Nations
Military awards and decorations of the Korean War
Awards established in 1950
Korea and the United Nations
Campaign medals

 George J. Beldecos, "Hellenic Orders, Decorations and Medals", pub. Hellenic War Museum, Athens 1991, .